Bella Paola (foaled 1955) was a French Thoroughbred racehorse who won several major races in France and Britain including the classic 1,000 Guineas and Epsom Oaks in 1957.

Background
Bella Paola was a big, powerful brown filly, standing 16.3 hands high, bred by her owner François Dupré. Although she was foaled in France her ancestry was predominantly German: she was sired by Ticino, who won the Deutsches Derby and three renewals of the Grosser Preis von Berlin. She was sent into training with François Mathet at Chantilly

Racing career
In 1957, Bella Paola finished third in the Prix Yacowlef on her debut and then won the Prix Georges de Kerhallet at Clairefontaine, the Critérium de Maisons-Laffitte and the Grand Critérium. She was rated the second best two-year-old in France – only her stablemate Texana was rated superior to her. Dupré and Mathet were always keen to attack the top prizes in England and Bella Paola won both the 1,000 Guineas and The Oaks. In the former she was ridden by Serge Boullenger, but because of military service he was not allowed to ride at Epsom and Max Garcia replaced him. Also runner-up in the Prix du Jockey Club, Bella Paola ran disappointingly in the Prix de l'Arc de Triomphe, but ended her career with victory in the Champion Stakes.

Stud record
At stud her best foal was Pola Bella, who won the Poule d'Essai des Pouliches and was second in the Prix de Diane before breeding several winners, including Val Divine.

Pedigree

References
 The Complete Encyclopedia of Horse Racing - written by Bill Mooney and George Ennor
 Bella Paola's pedigree and racing stats

1955 racehorse births
Racehorses bred in France
Racehorses trained in France
Thoroughbred family 4-n
1000 Guineas winners
Epsom Oaks winners